Neraluru is a village in Anekal taluk, Bangalore urban district, India. It is around 28 kilometers from Bangalore and 10 kilometers from Hosur, Tamil Nadu. The nearest mofussil towns are Attibele and Chandapura, both of which are within a 5 kilometer radius of Neralur. Electronics City, one of India's largest Information Technology parks, is around 10   kilometres from the village.  A few of the villages which share its boundaries with Neralur are - Guddahatti, Balagaranahalli, Lakshmisagara, Old Chandapura, Thirumagondanahalli, Bandapura, Yadavanahalli and Bendaganahalli. Kannada is the most widely spoken language in the village. With the advent of migrant laborers, and as a consequence of private townships springing up in unbridled abundance, people from all over the country can be found in varying proportions, which has made the language demographics getting diversified, thereby showcasing the multi cultural, multi ethnic splendour of our motherland.

History 

The name Neralur, has its origin possibly from its old name Chayapuri (which is not in much use now). The name Chayapuri (in Sanskrit) stands for village filled with shade (from Chaya=shade and puri=village) which when translated into Kannada becomes Neraluru (Chaya=Neralu and puri=ooru). The name suggests that the place was filled with huge trees that gave shade. Another speculation about the origin of the name is possibly because of a big "Black Jamun" tree (Nerale hannu in Kannada), that existed in the village.

Transport 

Many buses ply to Neralur from Bangalore. There is a direct BMTC(Bangalore Metropolitan Transport Corporation) bus (356K) from K R Market. A host of other BMTC and private buses, on its way to Attibele, Hosur and other nearby places, stop at the village near the National Highway 44 (Hosur Road) junction.

The nearest Railway station is at Heelalige, which is around 6 kilometers away from Neralur.

The Kempe Gowda International Airport at Devanahalli is at a distance of 63 kilometers from Neralur.

Grama Panchayat 

Neralur comes under Neralur Grama Panchayat which belongs to Bangalore Urban District, in Anekal Taluk, and part of Attibele Hobli. The Grama Panchayat office is located in Neralur village. Neralur Grama Panchayat happens to be one of the largest Grama Panchayats in Karnataka having a total of 64 elected representatives (as on year 2021) representing various strata of society. Neralur village alone contributes 14 members to the Grama Panchayat. Neralur Grama Panchayat includes nine villages under its umbrella, namely, Neralur, Thirumagondanahalli, Balagaranahalli, Icchanguru, Vaddarapalya, Yadavanahalli, Adigondanahalli, Guddahatti and Bendaganahalli. It is biggest gram panchayat in the entire Karnataka. To know the current members of Gram panchayat click the following link https://panchatantra.kar.nic.in/panchamitra/getGPData.aspx?selOption=2

Economy 

Many industries have sprung up around the village in the recent past, which has resulted in migrant workers settling down in the village. The Attibele industrial area covers a part of the village landscape. A host of residential townships have come up in the village vicinity in the recent past. The village has a Milk Producers Cooperative society (Neraluru Haalu Uthpadhakara Sahakara Sangha) which was established in the year 1976, and since then has revolutionized lives of most of the villagers in more ways than one. Agriculture is still a thriving activity in the village in spite of the advent of townships, and industries engulfing the village landscape.

Education 
There are various educational institutions situated in Neralur both in Kannada and English mediums of instruction. These educational institutions have satiated the young village folks' yearning for world class education which is being imparted by private as well as Government educational institutions. These educational institutes have no dearth of the requisite infrastructure as well as deeply focused faculty, to guide budding youngsters in building a strong, robust and emerging India. Due to the close proximity to Bengaluru and Hosur, there are world class professional Engineering, Medical, Law and Management colleges all within a commutable radius of Neralur

A mention needs to be made of the following schools imparting quality education ::

 Government Higher Primary School - This school was established in the year 1949, and is managed by the Department of Education, Government of Karnataka. Mid day meals are provided at the school premises. The school is situated amidst serene and lustrous surroundings, interspersed with tall and lush green trees.
 Swami Vivekananda Vidya Niketana - This school was established in the year 1985, managed by the SVVN TRUST, and is a private educational institution. This school caters to students from Pre Kinder Garten till Class X. The SVVN trust also runs a Pre University College at the premises. The Institute has a huge open playing arena, and a well equipped indoor stadium.

Temples in Neralur 

Neralur is famous for its ancient, vivid, stunning and powerful temples. A few of the temples that have been mentioned here date back to at least 100 years, if not more. Needless to say, regular religious and spiritual activities that happen with vivacious zeal and alacrity in all these temples, is one of the sole reasons that this ancient village has withstood the ruthless ravages of time, and made this village and its inhabitants happy and prosperous!

There are many temples in the village, which have been renovated recently. Chief among them are temples dedicated to Shiva, Anjaneya, Renuka Yellamma Devi, Aggu Muneshwara and Basaveshwara. There is an annual rathotsava(theru) held in the season of March/April, where a multi layered wooden chariot is pulled by devotees through the village thoroughfares. The chariot procession starts from the Shiva temple (Eeshwarana Gudi) and guides its way to the Yellamma Devi temple in the center of the village. The occasion is marked with religious fervor and gaiety. The chariot procession is the highlight of the festivities which last for over a week.
The Shivalinga in the temple is said to be around 100 years old and brought by a zealous priest, who walked barefoot, to and fro all the way from Neralur to Kashi/Varanasi, Uttar Pradesh, India.

Shri Parshwa Sushil Dham, a magnificent Jain Temple, is on National Highway 44 (Previously NH 7), on the outskirts of Neralur. An ashram dedicated to Sri Ramana Maharshi, built by a philanthropist and devotee of Sri Ramana Maharshi, is situated in Thirumagondanahalli, which neighbours Neralur.

As things stand today, most of these ancient temples have been renovated, and there are no existential issues for any of these temples, Constant renovation and upgradation of these temples, keeping with demands of changing times, have endeared these modern day divine marvels to the older and newer generation alike. Most of the temples are managed by a long history of family descendants, who derive a sense of innate pride and possessiveness to make sure that no religious rituals are missed, come what may. A few of the temples are managed by Muzarai department of the Government of Karnataka.

Given below is a comprehensive list of temples, both old and new, that is expansive enough, but not inclusive enough to cover all temples in Neralur.

Shiva Temple

Maddhuramma Temple

Sapalamma Temple

Anjaneya Temple

Maramma Temple

Basavanna Temple

Geragamma Temple

Yellamma Devi Temple

Avula Gangamma Devi Temple

Bairaveshwara Temple

Aggu Muneshwara Swamy Temple

Sai Nagar Muneshwara Swamy Temple

Ganesha Temple

Abhaya Anjaneya Temple

Gallery

References

Villages in Bangalore Urban district